Bocchoris telphusalis is a moth in the family Crambidae. It was described by Francis Walker in 1859. It is found in Japan, India and Indonesia (including Ambon Island and Borneo).

References

Moths described in 1859
Spilomelinae